Gironde is a department in southwestern France.

Gironde may also refer to:

Gironde estuary
The Gironde, or Girondins, a political group active in the French Revolution

See also
Gironde estuary and Pertuis sea Marine Nature Park